David Lemi (born 10 February 1982) is a professional rugby player who plays on the wing for Rouen.

Weighing 75 kg and only 1.75m tall, he is one of the smaller professional rugby players. However, his electric pace and low centre of gravity enabled him to be the 2nd highest Premiership try scorer for the 2005-06 season; and top scorer in the 2006-07 season.

As well as representing the Samoa national rugby sevens team, he has played for the senior 15-a-side team, representing his nation at the 2007 and 2011 World Cups.

Europe
Lemi caught Bristol coach Richard Hill's eye in the 2005 Safari Sevens in Kenya and joined Bristol on a one-year deal.

During the 2005-06 season, Lemi scored 8 tries in 12 appearances. He signed a two-year contract extension in spring 2006.

Despite Bristol Rugby's relegation at the end of the 2008–09 season, Lemi still won The Sunday Times Try of the Season Award for the try he scored against Bath Rugby in the first game of the season. He was the joint second top try scorer in the 2008-09 Guinness Premiership season.

Following Bristol's relegation, it was confirmed in April that Lemi would be leaving the club. He was initially linked with Llanelli Scarlets. However, in May, Lemi signed a contract with Wasps.
In 2012, Lemi signed a contract with Worcester Warriors and was reunited with former coach Richard Hill.

In 2014, Lemi was re-signed by Bristol, which would see him leave the Worcester Warriors at the end of the 2014 season and helped Bristol gain promotion the Aviva Premiership.

In April 2018, Lemi was announced as leaving Bristol Rugby at the end of the 2017/18 campaign, during which Bristol were promoted to the Aviva Premiership.

References

External links
 
 

1982 births
Living people
Samoan rugby union players
Rugby union wings
Bristol Bears players
Samoa international rugby union players
Samoan expatriate rugby union players
Expatriate rugby union players in England
Samoan expatriate sportspeople in England
Samoan expatriate sportspeople in Scotland
Expatriate rugby union players in Scotland
Wasps RFC players
Worcester Warriors players
Glasgow Warriors players
Rouen Normandie Rugby players
Male rugby sevens players
Samoa international rugby sevens players
Sportspeople from Apia